The 2014 South American Beach Games (Spanish:Juegos Suramericanos de Playa), officially the III South American Beach Games, is an international multi-sport event that is being held in Vargas, Venezuela, from May 14 – 24. It was slated to take place from 3 to 13 December 2013, but the Games was postponed at the time. This was due to athletes not able to get airline tickets to the event. Also, the infrastructure needed for the Games were not quite ready to receive the athletes. Therefore, ODESUR has allowed Vargas to continue preparing the venues for the Games.

Participating teams
All 14 nations of the Organización Deportiva Suramericana (ODESUR) are expected to compete in these Beach Games.

 
 
 
 
 
 
 
 
 
 
 
 
 
  (Host)

Sports
 Beach handball
 Beach football
 Beach rugby
 Beach tennis
 Beach volleyball
 Open water swimming
 Sailing
 Surfing
 Triathlon
 Water ski

Medal table

References

External links
 Official site

South American Beach Games
South American Beach Games
South American Beach Games
International sports competitions hosted by Venezuela
Multi-sport events in Venezuela
South American Beach Games
Vargas (state)
May 2014 sports events in South America